Esteban Guillen (born June 20, 1980) is an Uruguayan footballer who last played as a midfielder for Persiba Balikpapan.

Honours

Arema Indonesia
Indonesia Super League (1): 2009–10

References

External links 
 Profile at Liga Indonesia Official Site
 Profile at Foot Mercato

Uruguayan footballers
Uruguayan expatriate footballers
Living people
1980 births
Montevideo Wanderers F.C. players
Club Atlético River Plate (Montevideo) players
Club Cipolletti footballers
Atenas de San Carlos players
Expatriate footballers in Indonesia
Uruguayan expatriate sportspeople in Indonesia
Indonesian Premier Division players
Pelita Jaya FC players
Persikota Tangerang players
Liga 1 (Indonesia) players
Arema F.C. players
Persiba Balikpapan players
PSMS Medan players
Association football midfielders